Narciso Debourg  (14 March 1925 – 23 January 2022) was a Venezuelan sculptor who resided in Paris with his family.

Debourg was mainly known for creating visual structures using cylinders or solid geometric figures on a plane. He belonged to the Los Disidentes movement. He died on 23 January 2022, at the age of 96.

See also 
 Jesús Rafael Soto
 Alejandro Otero

References

1925 births
2022 deaths
20th-century Venezuelan sculptors
20th-century Venezuelan male artists
Abstract sculptors
Venezuelan expatriates in France